The 2011 Czech Republic motorcycle Grand Prix was the eleventh round of the 2011 Grand Prix motorcycle racing season. It took place on the weekend of 12–14 August 2011 at the Masaryk Circuit located in Brno.

MotoGP classification

Moto2 classification

125 cc classification

Championship standings after the race (MotoGP)
Below are the standings for the top five riders and constructors after round eleven has concluded.

Riders' Championship standings

Constructors' Championship standings

 Note: Only the top five positions are included for both sets of standings.

References

Czech Republic motorcycle Grand Prix
Czech Republic
Motorcycle Grand Prix
Czech Republic motorcycle Grand Prix